John Vincent Tilley (13 June 1941 – 18 December 2005) was a British Labour politician.

Tilley was born and raised in Derby. He was educated at Bemrose School, a state grammar school, before going on to read history at Trinity Hall, Cambridge. He then became a journalist at the Newcastle Journal, before moving to London as industrial, and later diplomatic, correspondent of the Scotsman.

In 1971, Tilley was elected to Wandsworth Council, where he became council leader. He was selected as Labour candidate to fight Kensington in the February 1974 and October 1974 elections, with improving results but no success. The party chose him to defend at a by-election its long-standing high majority in Lambeth Central in 1978, which he won.  The election was triggered by a caused by the death of Labour MP Marcus Lipton. In Parliament, he served on Labour's opposition front bench, resigning in 1982 in opposition to the Party leadership's stand on the Falklands War. As MP for the Brixton area, he worked with Lord Scarman after the 1981 Brixton Riots for a better understanding of local social problems.  He proposed a bill to amend the Sexual Offences (Amendment) Act 1976 to make rape in marriage illegal in 1983.

Tilley was a founding member of the Socialist Campaign Group in 1982, but his constituency seat was abolished for the 1983 election and he was selected to fight Southwark and Bermondsey instead. The seat had been safe Labour but Simon Hughes had won the constituency for the Liberal Party in a by-election earlier that year, and Hughes kept the seat in the general election. Tilley never returned to Parliament.

Tilley subsequently worked as chief economic adviser to the London Borough of Hackney and 11 years as parliamentary secretary to the Co-operative Union. From 2000 to 2002, he headed the parliamentary office of the Co-operative Group. An active co-operator, he wrote Churchill's Favourite Socialist: A Life of AV Alexander, a biography of an earlier co-operative activist and member of parliament, created a peer for his life work, A. V. Alexander, 1st Earl Alexander of Hillsborough.

Tilley's first marriage ended in divorce, after a daughter, Cleo. He married again in 1982 to Kathryn Riley, a Brixton teacher and Labour activist, later professor at the Institute of Education, University of London. They had a daughter, Jo. Tilley died of cancer in 2005.

References

External links 
 

1941 births
2005 deaths
Labour Co-operative MPs for English constituencies
Councillors in the London Borough of Wandsworth
Alumni of Trinity Hall, Cambridge
UK MPs 1974–1979
UK MPs 1979–1983
Politicians from Derby
Deaths from cancer in England